Robat-e Sofla (also Romanized as Robāţ-e Soflá and Robāt Soflá; also known as Robāţ) is a village in Khorram Dasht Rural District, Kamareh District, Khomeyn County, Markazi Province, Iran. At the 2006 census, its population was 81, in 16 families.

References 

Populated places in Khomeyn County